Michael Bauer (born August 14, 1980) is an American former professional basketball player. In 6 EuroChallenge appearances with Oostende, Bauer averaged 11.2 points per game. Previously, he has played professionally with Deutsche Bank Skyliners in Germany and Nancy, Roanne, and Pau-Orthez in France. He debuted professionally for Luxembourg club BBC Amicale Steinsel for the 2004–05 season. He was an all-star in Ligue Nationale de Basketball in 2006 while with Roanne.

Bauer is from Hastings, where he attended Hastings High School. Bauer played collegiate basketball for the Minnesota Golden Gophers. He held the several Gophers records for three-point shooting at the conclusion of his career. Bauer held marks of most three-pointers made (71) and attempted (190) from the 2002–03 season, before being passed in each mark by Lawrence Westbrook. Currently, Bauer is second in Minnesota history with 191 three-point field goals.

References

External links
Profile

1980 births
Living people
American expatriate basketball people in Belgium
American expatriate basketball people in France
American expatriate basketball people in Germany
American expatriate basketball people in Luxembourg
American expatriate basketball people in New Zealand
American men's basketball players
Basketball players from Minnesota
BC Oostende players
Élan Béarnais players
Minnesota Golden Gophers men's basketball players
Power forwards (basketball)
Skyliners Frankfurt players
SLUC Nancy Basket players